The Bedford Diaries is an American drama television series that premiered on March 29, 2006, on The WB and concluded its first season on May 10, 2006. The series was created by Tom Fontana and Julie Martin. This series was canceled on May 18, 2006, after one season.

A week prior to its premiere, The WB attempted to build buzz with scenes from the series' pilot posted on their website with more adult material not meant for broadcast, with those scenes edited out for the actual broadcast episode.

Plot
The Bedford Diaries explores the excitement and intensity of New York City college life through the eyes of six students with different backgrounds, experiences and ages, who are brought together in a provocative sexuality seminar. The seminar, which examines the human condition through sexuality, is taught by maverick Professor Jake Macklin, who will challenge and inspire his students as they question their assumptions about their own sexuality, life and identity. The themes include sexual responsibility, manipulation, and the differences between love and sex, passion and abstinence.

The students’ innermost thoughts and desires are told through video diaries they make to fulfill their weekly class assignments.

Among the students are Sarah Gregory, the Student Government President, poised and assured but vulnerable in love, and her younger brother, Owen Gregory, a freshman pre-med major, who plans to take advantage of all the fun college life has to offer. Natalie Dykstra, a lovely, outgoing and emotional woman, has returned to campus after a suicide attempt. She now struggles with being stereotyped as “the jumper.” Natalie's ex-boyfriend, Richard Thorne, a former Park Avenue bad boy who turned his life around after Natalie's jump, is also a member of the class. He's now clean, sober and works as the college newspaper's editor, but he's still tormented by old demons. Lee Hemingway is a scholarship student from Queens with ambitions to become an art historian. Lee has a serious girlfriend, Rachel, but he's attracted to another scholarship student, Zoe Lopez. Zoe talks a fast and flirty game, but despite her brash veneer, she is still a virgin and struggles with her growing feelings for Lee.

The series also stars Tony Award-winner Audra McDonald as Professor Carla Bonatelle, a Political Science professor and head of the Ethics Committee, who regularly clashes with Professor Macklin, as well as with Harold Harper (Peter Gerety), the fatherly, compassionate and often beleaguered dean of students.

Production 
The series was produced by HBO Independent Productions, Warner Bros. Television Production Inc. and The Levinson/Fontana Co., with executive producers Tom Fontana, Julie Martin, and Barry Levinson.

Outdoor scenes were filmed at Barnard College in New York City.

Cast
Matthew Modine as Professor Jake Macklin
Penn Badgley as Owen Gregory
Victoria Cartagena as Zoe Lopez
Tiffany Dupont as Sarah Gregory
Corri English as Natalie Dykstra
Audra McDonald as Professor Carla Bonatelle
Darien Sills-Evans as Aaron Evans
Milo Ventimiglia as Richard Thorne
Ernest Waddell as Lee Hemmingway
Aaron Yoo as James Fong
Scott Porter as Jason Miller
Jason Jurman as Peter Wortman
Emma Bell as Rachel Fein

Episodes

References

External links

 

2006 American television series debuts
2006 American television series endings
2000s American college television series
2000s American teen drama television series
English-language television shows
Television series by HBO Independent Productions
Television series by Warner Bros. Television Studios
Television series created by Tom Fontana
Television shows set in New York City
The WB original programming